O'Higgins Fútbol Club, also known as O'Higgins de Rancagua, is a Chilean professional football club based in Rancagua, that currently plays in the Campeonato Nacional. The club's home stadium is Estadio El Teniente, opened in 1945 and renovated for the 2015 Copa América, which was hosted by Chile.

Founded in 1955, the club was named in honour of the country's founding father and supreme director Bernardo O'Higgins, after the merger of the clubs O'Higgins Braden and América de Rancagua. O'Higgins has won two Primera B titles, and in 2013 they won their first top-flight championship against Universidad Católica, coached by Eduardo Berizzo; they later won the 2014 Supercopa de Chile on penalty kicks against Deportes Iquique.

History

Establishment

On 7 April 1955, after the merger of Rancagua's cross–town rival: O'Higgins Braden (that was born in 1954 from the merger between Braden F.C. and Instituto O'Higgins) and América de Rancagua, the club was founded thanks to Carlos Dittborn, the president of the Asociación Central de Football, who offered to put the name of the O'Higgins, which represents workers of Codelco in the city, under the name of Braden Copper; the name was also chosen in reference to the country's founding father and supreme director Bernardo O'Higgins, an important character of the Colonial Chile during the 1810s, who also identified with the city of Rancagua.

The colours of the club were originally from the Instituto O'Higgins, which were red, blue, and white. However, the Football Federation of Chile prohibited using the colors of the national team, so the club directors decided that the uniform would be sky blue, based on Uruguay's uniform, earning then the nickname of La Celeste. The stadium was named Estadio Braden Copper Company after the name of the company from its opening until the 1962 FIFA World Cup, when the name was changed to its current name, Estadio El Teniente, based on the El Teniente mine.

On 21 April 1955, the Asociación Central de Football decided that the team will play in the Primera División for the next season, with the first president being Nicolás Abumohor and the first head coach being Francisco Hormazábal. Their first game in the Campeonato Nacional was a 2–0 loss to Unión Española on 8 May 1955. Their first win came on 22 May of that same year, a 3–2 home victory against Ferrobádminton. In their first league tournament, the club finished ninth in the table, which put them in the relegation play-offs, where they earned their permanence in the top tier.

First seasons, relegations, and comebacks

The first great season of the club was in the 1959 season, where the club finished in fourth place under the orders of Argentine coach José Salerno, only four points behind league champion Universidad de Chile and behind third-placed team Santiago Wanderers on goal difference, making this one of its most successful Primera División campaigns, with José Benito Ríos as the key player and top scorer of the tournament with 22 goals.

A few seasons later, the team was relegated to the Segunda División after a poor campaign in 1963. The next season, with the signings of the defender Federico Vairo and the attacking midfielder Mario Desiderio, both from the Argentine Primera División, the team returned to Primera División. In special, the performances of Vairo consecrated him as the best footballer in the club's history according to the supporters of Rancagua, who chose the Rosarian centre back with the honour in 1999. Since the promotion in 1964, the club had average seasons, finishing mid-table, despite suffering the departures of Federico Vairo and Mario Desiderio to the Colombian side Deportivo Cali in 1966.

In the 1973 season, under the orders of the coaches Luis Vera and Jorge Aretio, O'Higgins and Huachipato both finished in third place behind of Unión Española and Colo-Colo, its best result since the 1959 season. In the 1975 season, the club was relegated again, but returned for the 1977 season after finishing runner up of the 1976 Primera B. After a notable 1978 tournament, where the team finished third in the league with Luis Santibáñez as head coach, it achieved qualification to the following edition of the Copa Libertadores by winning the Liguilla Pre-Libertadores, in which they achieved their biggest win for an international contest against Deportivo Galicia, beating the Venezuelan side 6–0 at El Teniente, and also achieved its most important away win for an international tournament, winning 1–0 in Valencia to the same Galicia. In the following season the club reached the fifth place in the league with Santibáñez as head coach again, qualifying to the 1980 Copa Libertadores via the Libertadores Liguilla after a notable unbeaten run of five matches, and winning the Liguilla over powerhouse clubs Universidad de Chile, Cobreloa and Unión Española.

Continental appearances, Copa Chile finals

While managing indifferent league form in the early 1980s, the club had its first South American success in the form of the Copa Libertadores. In the 1980 edition, O'Higgins reached the semi-finals, being eliminated by finishing last in a group with Uruguay's Club Nacional and Paraguay's Club Olimpia. During the 1984 edition of the Libertadores, the club finished last in its group, which was made up of fellow Chileans Universidad Católica, and Bolivian clubs Bolivar and Blooming. In the league, the team had poor campaigns from 1981 to 1983, although the club defeated Colo-Colo 6–1 in the 1983 season, and reached their first Copa Chile final, where it lost to Universidad Catolica in a liguilla group.

After financial problems with Codelco, the company owner of the club, the club was relegated to the Primera B in the 1985 season, with the possibility of being relegated to the Tercera División for another controversy related to Codelco. The next season, the club won the regular season and qualified to the promotion playoffs, but failed to win the group that consisted of 6 teams. In the 1987 season, with the defenders Gabriel Mendoza and Atilio Marchioni as key players, the club returned to the Primera División, after an exciting final with Lota Schwager at Talca.

Years later, the club hired Manuel Pellegrini as coach for the 1992 Copa Conmebol, in which they were eliminated by Argentine side Gimnasia de La Plata in the first round, in that occasion with players like Claudio Borghi, who won the 1986 FIFA World Cup with Argentina, the talented playmaker Jaime Riveros and the striker Gustavo De Luca, one of the most prolific goalscorers in Chilean football during the 1990s. In the 1992 season the club finished 6th in the league's aggregate table, giving them an opportunity to qualify for the 1993 Copa Libertadores via the Liguilla, but the club eventually failed to qualify for continental competitions after losing to U Catolica. Midway through the 1993 season, Pellegrini left to manage U de Chile.

In the 1994 season, under the orders of Roberto Hernández, O'Higgins reached the Copa Chile finals, after beating Universidad de Chile 2–1 at the Estadio Nacional in the semi-finals. However, in the final against Colo-Colo, the club lost on penalties, whilst for the Primera División tournament, the Rancaguan side finished in the third place of the table, therefore missing out on achieving Copa Libertadores qualification. The next season, O'Higgins failed to qualify to the Libertadores Liguilla, ending only in the sixth position of the Primera División tournament.

The Instability: 1996–2004

In the 1996 season, the club signed great players, such as midfielder Clarence Acuña, Argentine playmaker Gerardo Martino, and strikers Carlos Poblete and Ariel Cozzoni. However, the team got relegated to the Primera B, after finishing last in the table. In 1997, an Apertura and Clausura format was used, which made it difficult to achieve promotion since it wasn't utilised in the Clausura. Although O'Higgins had great campaigns that season, finishing in the top 4 of both tournaments, it failed to achieve promotion.

Two years later, under the orders of René Serrano, the team achieved promotion to the First Division again. In 1999, the Rancagua club finished in tenth place, in which Mario Núñez and Jaime González also became the most successful goalscorer pair in Chilean football with 57 goals between both strikers. In the 2001 season, with financial problems and a poor season, it returned to the Primera B, having gone through three managers: Guillermo Páez, Rubén Espinoza, and Luis Droguett. Luis Droguett almost saved the club from being relegated, including a victory against Colo-Colo, but ultimately it was not enough to stay in the top tier.

In 2002, under Luis Droguett's orders, the club had a decent season in the second tier but wasn't fighting for the promotion playoffs. For the 2003 season, Droguett was replaced by Eduardo Salas. The economic problems in the club were evident again, and for the most part the club used youth players. These problems resulted in the club's failure to be promoted again, although they were in the promotion spots (top 2 of table) until a 2–0 loss with Everton, which moved the club to a fourth-place finish. The 2004 season was very similar to the previous season; although the club had a very promising start, it failed to reach the Primera División again after being defeated 3–0 by Deportes Melipilla, under the orders of the Paraguayan head coach Sergio Nichiporuk, who had replaced Eduardo Salas in June.

Despite the sports failure, the club was also experiencing hard financial problems, mainly because of Codelco but also because of irregularities in the board. However, in December 2004, it was reported that the ANFP's former president and entrepreneur Ricardo Abumohor would buy the team to fix the situation.

Abumohor takeover, Garcés and Sampaoli era

For the 2005 season, ex-goalkeeper Nelson Cossio became the club's new manager. However, the club started to distance itself from the promotion places after a run of six winless matches. After a draw to Deportes Copiapó in August, Cossio was sacked. Shortly after Cossio was sacked, the club was purchased by ANFP's former president, Ricardo Abumohor, who bought the team from Codelco, having the Primera B title as the principal objective for the return to the Primera División. He brought in manager Gerardo Silva as Cossio's replacement, and the club eventually achieved that long awaited objective, defeating Deportes Melipilla 4–3 on aggregate for the promotion with Hugo Brizuela and Mario Núñez as the key players of the success.

The next season, the club signed Jorge Garcés as coach, qualifying for the playoffs of the Torneo Clausura, where they beat Coquimbo Unido in the quarter finals and were eliminated by Audax Italiano in the semi-finals with controversial decisions made by referee Rubén Selman. In the 2007 season, O'Higgins finished twelfth in the Apertura table and were eliminated by Colo-Colo during the playoffs for the Clausura. The first leg ended in a 5–0 precipitous loss at Rancagua; this result basically sealed the series for the whites with the second leg at Santiago, which finished 1–1, but 6–1 in Colo-Colo's favor on global.

In December 2007, after the departure of Jorge Garcés to Deportes Concepción, the club reached an agreement with Jorge Sampaoli of Sporting Cristal. Sampaoli had a successful season during the Apertura 2008, with talented players like Jean Beausejour and Carlos Carmona, finishing third in the league table but being eliminated in the playoff quarter-finals by Universidad de Chile. In the Clausura, it had a similar season, and the team was eliminated by Palestino in the quarter-finals. In 2009, Sampaoli was fired after a game with Universidad de Concepción, due to failing to qualify for the Clausura play-offs because of a 15th-placed league finish, and having suffered a 6–1 defeat with Unión Española for the Apertura play-off quarter-finals at Estadio Santa Laura.

The board signed Roberto Hernández again as coach for the 2010 season. Hernandez brought the team into the top 5 places into the table during the first half of the season, but after the FIFA World Cup break he started to have poor results, so he was fired and Marco Antonio Figueroa arrived as a replacement. The most important achievements of Figueroa's period was beating Universidad de Chile 1–0 at the Estadio Nacional and Colo-Colo 2–1; however the team finished in a mediocre 10th place and Figueroa left the club for Mexican club Veracruz.

The club's board signed up Ivo Basay to face the 2011 season, where the club finished fifth in the Apertura league table and qualified to the play-offs, with Fernando De la Fuente and Enzo Gutiérrez as key players. In the play-offs stage, O'Higgins beat Palestino, reaching the semi-finals against Universidad de Chile, in which they were defeated 8–1 on aggregate. Basay was sacked in the 2011 Clausura, with poor results and the 7–1 loss against U de Chile in the Apertura semi-finals being the deciding factors.

Eduardo Berizzo era: First league and supercopa title

In December 2011, the club's board signed manager Eduardo Berizzo for the 2012 season. The year started of abrupt form with Fernando De la Fuente's departure after a strong discussion with new head coach Berizzo and his assistant, Roberto Bonano. It was then confirmed that the player would be loaned to Deportes La Serena, which meant that O'Higgins were losing of this form one of the best defensive midfielders in Chilean football to face the Torneo de Apertura, given that De la Fuente had a great 2011 season.

However, the club's board surprised the public with the signings of Argentine attacking midfielder Ramón Fernández, who had previously been tempted by the country's powerhouse clubs: Colo-Colo and Universidad de Chile, the Paraguayan footballer Rodrigo Rojas, who played for River Plate, and finally defender Julio Barroso, who played for Boca Juniors and was champion of the 2005 U-20 World Cup with Argentina.

Berizzo's first season and first final

On 27 January 2012, Berizzo achieved his first competitive victory with the club in a league match against Antofagasta with a goal from new signing Ramón Fernández, narrowly losing the next match at the capital Santiago with Colo-Colo 1–0. On 25 February, the team achieved its most important victory against Universidad de Chile at home, a 3–0 victory with goals from Enzo Gutiérrez, Guillermo Suárez and Ramon Fernández, in where Luis Marín saved a penalty to keep a clean sheet, earning of this form the first place in the league table, which was lost when Universidad Católica defeated the team 2–1 on 11 March. Despite this loss, the team achieved four consecutive wins, with Julio Barroso and Rodrigo Rojas as the key players, a run that finished when Huachipato defeated the club 2–1 on 15 April. Despite the defeat at the city of Talcahuano, the team bounced back and beat Palestino 5–0 at home in the next match. The following week, a 1–0 away victory over Santiago Wanderers in Valparaíso gave the club qualification to the 2012 Copa Sudamericana, where they were eliminated by Cerro Porteño in the first stage 7–3 on aggregate.

The team qualified for the play-offs after a successful Apertura tournament, where the club finished second in the table, only under U. de Chile. The club had to begin the play-offs by facing Unión La Calera in the quarter-finals. In the first match at La Calera on 24 May, the team won 1–0 with a free kick scored by Ramón Fernández, who did not celebrate the goal as he was planning to leave the club at the conclusion of the season. In Rancagua for the second match, the club clinched a 3–2 victory, thanks to Enzo Gutiérrez, who scored an incredible bicycle kick that defeated keeper Lucas Giovini. In the semi-finals, the club faced Unión Española at Santiago in the first leg, where the club was defeated 1–0 at the Estadio Santa Laura, but won the second match 2–1 with goals of Luis Pedro Figueroa and Rodrigo Rojas, earning a spot in the finals for the first time in its history on the away goals rule, after the 2–2 aggregate score.

In the first leg of the finals against U. de Chile, O'Higgins beat "La U" at home 2–1 with goals of Rojas and the Argentine full back Alejandro López. In the second leg on 2 July, played at the Estadio Nacional, the scoreline was 1–1 which put O'Higgins up 3–2 on aggregate, and was about to win their first league title by becoming Torneo de Apertura champions, until the 92nd minute, because with Guillermo Marino's goal the series was equalized at 3–3 and the match went to penalties. "La U" won the penalty shootout 2–0 thanks to their keeper Jhonny Herrera, who saved three penalties. However, the match was full of controversy, because the referee Enrique Osses conceded a non–existent penalty to Marino, that was scored by Aránguiz, and unfairly red-carded centre back Julio Barroso, after Universidad de Chile defender José Rojas had initially taunted Barroso.

Tomé Tragedy
In the Torneo Transición 2013, Berizzo brought in many reinforcements such as Osmán Huerta, Mariano Uglessich, Braulio Leal, Gonzalo Barriga and Pablo Calandria among others. In this tournament the club also played the last official match at Estadio El Teniente, after it was awarded for renovations ahead of the 2015 Copa America, rotating between Estadio Santa Laura, Estadio La Granja and Estadio Monumental David Arellano during the rest of the tournament.

After the away victory against Huachipato at Estadio CAP in the third matchday of the league, an unfortunate tragedy happened. On 9 February 2013 at around midnight in Tomé, a bus carrying O'Higgins fans crashed and 16 fans died. Instead of going back to Rancagua, the fans decided to make a stop in Dichato for a festival. Out of 37 fans in the bus, 16 died and 21 were injured. As a result of the tragic accident, a three-day mourning was declared in Tomé and Rancagua, and fans made a farewell to the deceased at the Estadio El Teniente.

O'Higgins eventually finished fourth after an acceptable campaign, where it was beaten by Unión Española, Universidad Católica and Cobreloa. However, the club had to finish third to qualify for the Copa Sudamericana, and therefore missed out.

Another fight for the title
For the 2013–14 Torneo Apertura, O'Higgins is reinforced with players like Fernando Gutiérrez, Francisco Pizarro and Pedro Pablo Hernández. The club started playing this tournament against Deportes Iquique, and win with a goal that was eventually scored by the tournament's top scorer, Pablo Calandria. In the next match the club defeats Deportes Antofagasta 2–1 with goals from Pizarro and Gonzalo Barriga. On the next match day, the club tied with Audax Italiano but after that they team went on a significant winning streak, which began by beating Cobresal in El Salvador, and then Cobreloa, Universidad de Concepción, Universidad Católica, Unión Española and a victory over Unión La Calera in the final minutes, with the club only losing two games against Palestino and Colo-Colo.

The match versus Rangers de Talca

On 7 December 2013, the last match day of the championship, the club has to visit  Rangers de Talca, where the team starts losing with a Mauricio Gómez goal, but the team did not give up and turned the game around in their favor with a penalty from Pablo Calandria and a goal from Julio Barroso. In the second half, it seemed like the title was slipping from their hands, because Rodolfo González and Esteban Ciaccheri scored at the Estadio Fiscal de Talca, to put the score at 3–2 in favor of Rangers.

Berizzo makes changes and substitutes Francisco Pizarro and Osmán Huerta into the match, and Huerta, with his first touch of the game, overcomes goalkeeper Nicolás Peric and ties the game at 3–3 with 10 minutes left, but in the 90' Calandria was brought down in the penalty box and referee Patricio Polic awarded a penalty for O'Higgins, along with red-carding Rangers goalkeeper Peric. Since Rangers had already used up all of their available substitutions, midfielder Hugo Diaz had to be the goalkeeper. At the same time, Universidad Católica was winning against La Calera in Quillota, so if O'Higgins tied or lost then Universidad Catolica would be the champion. In the last minute of the match, Calandria scored his penalty, unleashing the wild celebrations of 4,500 fans, with the club having completed an epic comeback to win the match 4–3, after Universidad Católica overcame La Calera 2–0.

The final

After a hard-fought championship title fight against Universidad Católica, both finish the tournament with the same number of points. This meant there had to be a tiebreaking game, after an amendment to championship rules, since before the modification the champion was whoever had a better goal difference if both teams had the same number of points. This was the case for the 2013 tournament, in which Unión Española and Universidad Católica had equal points until the last matchday, but the league championship was given to Union Española because it had a better goal difference.

On 10 December 2013, in front of a sold-out Estadio Nacional de Chile, O'Higgins clinched a victory against the Crusaders, with Pablo Hernández scoring the only goal of the match, who ultimately entered club history and in the hearts of the fans as the person to give the club its first Primera División league title.

Supercopa Champion and back to Copa Libertadores 

After winning the final of the 2013 Torneo Apertura, the club returns to the Copa Libertadores after almost three decades, (their last participation was in 1984), participating in Group 3 with Cerro Porteño, Deportivo Cali and Lanús. The first game was played against Lanús on 13 February 2014 at Estadio Ciudad de Lanús, where the match ends 0–0. In the second match, O'Higgins faced Deportivo Cali at Estadio Monumental in Santiago, where Yerson Opazo put the ball past Colombian goalkeeper Faryd Mondragón, becoming the first player to score for the club in a Copa Libertadores match in 30 years, with the match ending 1–0 in favor of the celestes. In the third match the club played at the Estadio Monumental again, this time against Cerro Porteño, where the Rancaguan club began winning 2–0 with one of the goals being scored by Eduardo Alejandro López from a nice free-kick. However, after midfielder Braulio Leal was sent off, the momentum decreased and the Paraguayan club tied the game 2–2.

In the next meeting the club played Cerro Porteño again but this time at Estadio General Pablo Rojas, where the club are defeated 2–1. In the fifth match the club traveled to Colombia to face Deportivo Cali at Estadio Olímpico Pascual Guerrero, where Yerson Opazo scored one of the best goals in the tournament from about 30 meters, but Deportivo Cali's Néstor Camacho tied the game at 1–1, and it finished with that score.

In the last group stage match against Lanus, O'Higgins returned to Estadio El Teniente after its renovation for the 2015 Copa América. O'Higgins had the chance to make the next round, but Calandria's penalty was saved by Agustín Marchesín, and the game ended 0–0, which meant the celestes were eliminated from the cup. O'Higgins finished with 7 points and in third place of its group.

In the Clausura 2014, O'Higgins ended in third place with 30 points, and in the Accumulated Table as second with 69 points, (surpassing Colo-Colo, Clausura champions) which qualified it to play the Supercopa de Chile to see who would be the Superchampion. The game was played at the Estadio San Carlos de Apoquindo against 2013–14 Copa Chile champion Deportes Iquique. Iquique started winning the match with a goal from Rodrigo Ezequiel Díaz, and O'Higgins leveled the score five minutes before the end of the first half with a goal from Luis Pedro Figueroa. The match ended 1–1 after 120 minutes and went into penalties. O'Higgins won 3–2 after Rodrigo Brito of Deportes Iquique missed his penalty, unleashing the joy of over 6,000 celeste fans who came to the Santiago Metropolitan Region, and becoming the second Superchampion of Chilean football.

Sava and Sánchez: After Berizzo era

Shortly after winning the Supercopa, Berizzo leaves O'Higgins and signs a contract with Spanish club Celta de Vigo. Berizzo also signed Pablo Hernández and took him to Celta, while Facundo Sava, a friend of Berizzo, became the new coach in June 2014, but he was fired because of irregular results in January 2015. After that, another Argentine took charge of the club, this time Pablo Sánchez.

Facilities

Stadium 

The club's home ground is Estadio El Teniente, built in September 1945 and located in Rancagua, being named Braden Copper Company Stadium, because that company was the stadium's owner. The first professional game was during the 1955 Primera División tournament, in a match that O'Higgins won 3–2 to Ferrobádminton.

In 1960, after the 9.5 earthquake of Valdivia that destroyed the original venues of the 1962 FIFA World Cup, the Chilean delegation designed the city of Rancagua as a venue, after the refusal of Valparaíso and Antofagasta. The first international match was between Argentina and Bulgaria, where with a goal of Héctor Facundo, the South Americans defeated the Europeans on 30 May. El Teniente was the home stadium of all Group D matches, and one quarter-final game between West Germany and Yugoslavia.

The Government of Chile acquired the 51% of shares to United States' Braden Copper Company in 1967, as part of the copper nationalization, that culminated four years later, becoming property of Codelco Chile, being re–named with the current name of Parque El Teniente, in reference to mine ubicated in locality of Machalí.

A new stadium with capacity for 14,087 persons was confirmed by the club's owner Ricardo Abumohor in 2013, and the old stadium was demolished in 2014.

The new stadium was inaugurated on 8 April 2014. In the inaugural match, O'Higgins played against Lanús for the week 6 of the 2014 Copa Libertadores. The final result was 0–0, marking the elimination of the club from the competition, because it needed a victory to advance to the next round. In 2015, it hosted two group stage matches of the 2015 Copa América.

Monasterio Celeste

The training facilities of the club are called the Monasterio Celeste, located on the outskirts of Rancagua, exactly in Requínoa. It replaces the old complex La Gamboína, which until 2014 was the training ground of the club.

The complex consists of seven pitches of natural grass, a mini-stadium of artificial grass, and a hotel with the facilities for the team.

The complex was finished in 2014, but O'Higgins trained there for the first time on 4 January 2013. It was a national team host complex for the 2015 Copa América.

Players

Since the club's establishment in April 1955, more than one thousand of the players on the team have been Chilean. Aníbal González is the historic top−scorer of the club with 117 goals in all competitions. Mario Desiderio is considered the best player in the club's history.

1. Only includes Campeonato Nacional, Copa Chile and international competitions. Bold indicates player is still active.

Foreign players like Federico Vairo have also been important players in the history of club. During the mid–1960s, Vairo was a former River Plate player, earning three consecutive Primera División titles, alongside players like the keeper Amadeo Carrizo, the midfielder Omar Sívori, among others.

Another important player of the club is Pablo Hernández, also Argentine, who was part of the historic squad led by Eduardo Berizzo that won the 2013–14 Torneo de Apertura. He is also important because he scored the goal in the Super Final match against Universidad Catolica, which gave the league title to the club. He was one of the most important players of the team, alongside the goalkeepers Paulo Garcés and Roberto González, the defenders Julio Barroso, Mariano Uglessich and Yerson Opazo, the midfielders Luis Pedro Figueroa, César Fuentes, Braulio Leal, Gonzalo Barriga and the striker and top goalscorerPablo Calandria, among others.

The team has had several Argentine footballers in majority, but also players of Paraguay, Uruguay, Brazil, Colombia and Venezuela have been in minority.

In 2006, under the orders of the manager Jorge Garcés, Giancarlo Maldonado, Venezuela national team striker, was signed, becoming the first footballer of that nationality to play in the club, and Aílton da Silva, seasons later, was the first player of Brazilian nationality in 2008 to arrive at the club.

Juan Rodrigo Rojas, now playing in Cerro Porteño, and Octavio Rivero, who was signed by Vancouver Whitecaps of Major League Soccer for a US$1.5M fee, were the last players of Paraguayan and Uruguayan nationality, respectively. The last Colombian player was Marco Pérez.

First-team squad

Chilean teams are limited by the ANFP to have on their roster a maximum of seven foreign players. ANFP rules also say  the number of shirts can't exceed the number of registered players. As of the 2019 season, all Chilean teams must have included in the line-up, at least two Chilean players born on or after January 1, 2000, plus that a youth player plays at least 675 minutes (These players are marked as U-20 players).

Players with multiple citizenship
  Pablo Hernández
  Facundo Castro

2022 Summer transfers

In

Out

Team of The Century
In 1999, the fans of the club voted to choose the team of the 20th Century. Among the players which are in the starting line-up are the Argentine defender Federico Vairo, Miguel Ángel Neira, Mario Núñez, Mario Desiderio and the top goal-scorer of the history of the club, Aníbal González. The manager chosen was Luis Santibáñez, which reached two of the four participations in the Copa Libertadores, and led the club to its furthest position in the competition, the semi-finals, in 1980.

Recent results

Season stats
{| class="wikitable" style="text-align:center;"
|-
! style="color:white; background:#5f91ce;"|Season
! style="color:white; background:#5f91ce;"|Rank
! style="color:white; background:#5f91ce;"|
! style="color:white; background:#5f91ce;"|
! style="color:white; background:#5f91ce;"|
! style="color:white; background:#5f91ce;"|
! style="color:white; background:#5f91ce;"|
! style="color:white; background:#5f91ce;"|
! style="color:white; background:#5f91ce;"|
! style="color:white; background:#5f91ce;"|Top scorer(s) in league
! style="color:white; background:#5f91ce;"|Goals
! style="color:white; background:#5f91ce;"|
! style="color:white; background:#5f91ce;"|
! style="color:white; background:#5f91ce;"|
! style="color:white; background:#5f91ce;"|
|-
|Campeonato Nacional 2021
|13th
|32
|9
|11
|12
|31
|41
|38
|style="text-align:left;"|Marcelo Larrondo
|8
|2R
|
|
|
|-
|Campeonato Nacional 2020
|10th
|34
|12
|9
|13
|40
|39
|45
|style="text-align:left;"|Facundo Castro
|7
|
|
|
|
|-
|Campeonato Nacional 2019
|8th
|24
|10
|4
|10
|34
|35
|34
|style="text-align:left;"|Maximiliano Salas
|6
|R16
|
|
|
|-
|Campeonato Nacional 2018
|8th
|30
|12
|5
|13
|41
|41
|41
|style="text-align:left;"|Nicolás Mazzola
|8
|2R
|
|
|
|}

Managers

The first coach of the club was Francisco Hormazábal, who was signed for the 1955 Primera División tournament. In 1957, the board hired European Carlos Snopec as manager, who was the first international coach of the club. From 1958 to 1960 Argentine José Salerno was the manager of the club. The club went through three managers in 1961, and four managers in 1972.

In 1978–79, the club achieved an historic season with Luis Santibáñez as coach, who qualified O'Higgins to the 1980 Copa Libertadores' semi-finals, where the team lost to Club Nacional of Uruguay. In the early 1990s, the club's board signed Manuel Pellegrini to face the 1992 Copa Conmebol, where the club was eliminated early by Gimnasia y Esgrima de La Plata Then, with a prior spell of Nelson Acosta, who potentiated players like Jaime Riveros, the club achieved the finals of the Copa Chile in 1994, being runner–up under Roberto Hernández as coach. In 2005, Nelson Cossio became coach with the objective of reaching the first division again, which he achieved. Oscar Meneses coached the team during the Apertura tournament in their return to the first division, but was sacked due to poor performances.

In 2006, Jorge Garcés became coach of the club to play the Torneo Clausura, who abandoned the institution the following season, after a 5–0 loss with Colo-Colo. In December 2007, Ricardo Abumohor, the club's owner, reported that he hired Argentine manager Jorge Sampaoli for the new tournament, where he had decent seasons with players like Jean Beausejour and Carlos Carmona as key players.

After a regular tournament in the 2010 season, Ivo Basay was signed for the 2011 Apertura. Basay was replaced by José Cantillana for the 2011 Clausura.

In January 2012, the club's board signed Eduardo Berizzo and his assistant coach, former River Plate's goalkeeper in the 1980s, Roberto Bonano. Under Berizzo's administration, the team reached the Apertura final, where the team finished runner-ups after losing 2–0 in penalties to Universidad de Chile. However, this result gave the club qualification to the 2012 Copa Sudamericana, which is important due to the fact that O'Higgins hadn't played a continental competition since 1992. Berizzo also lead the team to their first league title in the 2013–14 Apertura, and to the Supercup win in 2014.

Shortly after the Supercup win, Berizzo was replaced by Facundo Sava.

Current technical staff

Chronology of managers

This list includes the managers and the interim managers since the foundation of the club until today. Only 13 managers in the history of the club are or were foreigners.

  Francisco Hormazábal (1955–56)
  Salvador Calvente (1957)
  Carlos Snopec (1957)
  José Salerno (1958–60)
  Carlos Orlandelli (1960)
  Roberto Rodríguez (1961)
  George Robledo (1961)
  Hernán Carrasco (1961)
  Ladislao Pakozdi (1961–62)
  José Pérez (1963–67)
  Dante Pesce (1968)
  Leonardo Bedoya (1968–69)
  Jorge Aretio (1970)
  Leonardo Bedoya (1971)
  Hernán Carrasco (1972)
  Luis Vidal (1972)
  Ovidio Casartelli (1972)
  Caupolicán Peña (1972)
  Luis Vera (1973)
  Jorge Aretio (1973)
  Jorge Venegas (1974)
  Leonardo Bedoya (1974–75)
  José Pérez (1975)
  Jorge Aretio (1975)
  Armando Tobar (1976–77)
  Nelson Oyarzún (1977)
  Luis Santibáñez (1978–79)
  Orlando Aravena (1979)
  Francisco Molina (1980)
  Orlando Aravena (1981)
  Germán Cornejo (1982–83)
  Leonardo Bedoya (1984)
  Gastón Guevara (1985)
  Jorge Luco (1985)
  Manuel Cáceres (1985)
  Luis Santibáñez (1986)
  Jaime Campos (1986)
  Eugenio Jara (1987)
  Ricardo Horta (1988)
  Juan Carlos Gangas (1988)
  Nelson Acosta (1988–91)
  Germán Cornejo (1992)
  Manuel Pellegrini (1992–93)
  Roberto Hernández (1994–95)
  Roque Alfaro (1996)
  Jorge Socías (1996)
  José Sulantay (1997)
  Gerardo Pelusso (1997)
  René Serrano (1998–99)
  Eduardo Salas (interim) (2000)
  Guillermo Páez (2000–01)
  Joel Retamal (2001)
  Rubén Espinoza (2001)
  Luis Droguett (interim) (2002)
  Eduardo Salas (2003–04)
  Sergio Nichiporuk (2004)
  Nelson Cossio (2005)
  Gerardo Silva (2005)
  Óscar Meneses (2006)
  Ronald Yávar (interim) (2006)
  Jorge Garcés (2006–07)
  Jorge Sampaoli (2008–09)
  Gerardo Silva (2009)
  Roberto Hernández (2010)
  Marco Antonio Figueroa (2010)
  Ivo Basay (2011)
  Cristián Arán (interim) (2011)
  José Cantillana (2011)
  Eduardo Berizzo (2012–14)
  Facundo Sava (2014–15)
  Pablo Sánchez (2015)
  Cristián Arán (2015–17)
  Gabriel Milito (2017–2018)
  Mauricio Larriera (2018)
  Marco Antonio Figueroa (2018–2019)
  Patricio Graff (2020)
  Dalcio Giovagnoli (2020-)

Management

The club has had 17 presidents throughout history. The first president of the institution was Francisco Rajcevich, who held the post between January and December 1955, while Patricio Mekis had the longest time period in charge of the institution (between January 1958 and January 1965) and is currently honorary president of the club.

Formerly in the corporation presidents elected the same 12 directors-leaders who take the time to divide the charges. In turn, the elected president must be accepted by a majority of members. This president was in principle intended to be the leader for two years, but after a year, when half-directory is renewed, 8 leaders who continue plus 8 new or re-elected decide whether the current president remains in charge or another is chosen.

In 2005, the club had three different presidents due to internal problems and economic problems facing the club. After this, Ricardo Abumohor purchases the club and takes the role of president.

Current management staff

Chronology of presidents

 1955–56: Francisco Rajcevich
 1957–58: Dionisio Valenzuela
 1958–65: Patricio Mekis
 1966–72: Alberto Musse
 1973–75: Carlos Latife
 1976–82: Alfonso Orueta
 1983–88: Héctor Cortéz
 1989–90: Óscar Albornoz
 1991–92: Juan Romero
 1992–93: Rodolfo Cueto
 1994–96: Alex Acosta
 1997: José Donoso
 1997–00: Omar Pozo
 2001–04: Francisco Arce
 2005: Waldo Quiroz
 2005: Daniel Sánchez
 2005: Juan Carlos Latife
 2006–present: Ricardo Abumohor

Club badge and colours

The current badge of the club is a Phoenix over a pentagon with the colours white, yellow, and green. The colors remember the club colors of Instituto O'Higgins, América de Rancagua and O'Higgins Braden respectively. Several Rancaguan people affirm that the phoenix represents the Chilean historic city, in where the founding father and hero of the country, Bernardo O'Higgins, led his army to win the Battle of Rancagua against the Spaniards, highlighting that the club's name is in honour of him.

The club's current home kit colours are sky blue and white, whilst the traditional away colours are yellow in honour of América, but in recent years the away kits have been white and black. In the 2010 Campeonato Petrobras, O'Higgins wore the former kit of O'Higgins Braden as away colours.

An unusual fact was that in the 2012 Torneo de Apertura first leg final at home against Universidad de Chile, the team played with the away kit colours in Rancagua, the city where the team is based.

The current home kit of the club consists of a sky blue shirt, black shorts and socks. The kit is manufactured by Adidas, and the main sponsor is Sun Monticello.

Current sponsors

 Adidas
 Latamwin
 Mall Patio Rancagua
 Mundo
 Clínica MEDS
 Pedidos Ya
 Homecenter Sodimac
 Universidad de O'Higgins
 Ruta del Maipo ISA
 Gatorade
 JAC Motors

All-time kits

Kit manufacturers and sponsors

Club culture

Supporter groups
 Trinchera Celeste (barra brava)
 Arca de Noé

Tomé Tragedy

On February 9, 2013, after the match between the club and Huachipato, a group of fans traveled in a bus to Tomé, where in the Cuesta Caracol fell into a ravine, causing the death of 16 fans. As a sign of solidarity, a minute of silence was carried out in the different leagues of the ANFP for matches played in the following days, and in Rancagua and Tomé a day of mourning was planned.

Rivalries 
O'Higgins doesn't have a defined classic rival, but they do have a minor rivalry with CSD Enfoque because both clubs are from Rancagua. Since Enfoque's establishment, the club plays the Rancagua derby since 2011, the top–scorer of that derby is the Argentine striker Guillermo Suárez. The last official game between both clubs occurred during a 2–2 Copa Chile away draw, with goals scored by Boris Sagredo and Suárez. In the first leg match played at El Teniente, O'Higgins comfortably won 3–0 with goals from Guillermo Suárez, Tomás Lizana, and Enzo Gutiérrez. In 2013, the clubs played a friendly game, where O'Higgins won 3–1.

However, the club does have a regional rivalry with Curicó Unido and Rangers de Talca.

Club details

All-time statistics

This table includes only results pertaining to the Campeonato Nacional and the Primera B, separated by year of the realization of the tournament, as well as the different rounds that had tournaments.

Results

Overview
Last updated: Campeonato Nacional 2018.

1. 1955–63, 1965–75, 1977–85, 1988–96, 1999–01, 2006–
2. 1964, 1976, 1986–87, 1997–98, 2002–05
3. Did not participate in the years 1986, 1987, 1998

International record

In his history, the club has qualified for six international tournaments, including four times in Copa Libertadores, thrice in Copa Sudamericana and one in the Copa Conmebol.

Overview
Last updated: 31 December 2018.

Matches

Affiliated Clubs

  Chelsea
  OGC Nice

Honours

Domestic Competitions

 Campeonato Nacional
 Winners (1): 2013–14 Apertura
 Runners-up (1): 2012 Apertura
 Primera B de Chile
  Winners (1): 1964
 Runners-up (3): 1976, 1986, 1998
 Copa Chile
 Runners-up (2): 1983, 1994
 Liguilla Pre-Libertadores
 Winners (2): 1978, 1979
 Liguilla Pre-Sudamericana
 Winners (1): 2015–16 Clausura
 Supercopa de Chile
 Winners (1): 2014

O'Higgins Braden

Segunda División
 Segunda División (1): 1954

América de Rancagua

Segunda División
 Segunda División (2): Runners-up 1953, 1954

Reserves and Youth leagues

O'Higgins had a reserve team called O'Higgins F.C. Fútbol Joven that competes in the Fútbol Joven de Chile.

References

External links

Official websites

  
  O'Higgins at the ANFP official website

News sites

  La Celeste a Fan site
  Capo de Provincia a Fan site
  Soy Celeste a Fan site

 
Football clubs in Chile
Association football clubs established in 1955
1955 establishments in Chile
Rancagua